This was the first edition of the tournament.

Blaž Kavčič and Blaž Rola won the title after defeating Lukáš Klein and Alex Molčan 2–6, 6–2, [10–3] in the final.

Seeds

Draw

References

External links
 Main draw

Zadar Open - Doubles